Chickasawhatchee Creek is a stream in the U.S. state of Georgia. It is a tributary to the Flint River.

Chickasawhatchee  is a name derived from the Hitchiti language, meaning "council house creek". Variant names are "Chicasawhatchie Creek", "Chickasawhachee Creek", "Chickasawhatchie Creek", and "Chickasyhatchy Creek".

References

Rivers of Georgia (U.S. state)
Rivers of Baker County, Georgia
Rivers of Calhoun County, Georgia
Rivers of Dougherty County, Georgia
Rivers of Terrell County, Georgia